The 1988 WTA German Open was a women's tennis tournament played on outdoor clay courts at the Rot-Weiss Tennis Club in West Berlin and was part of Tier I of the 1988 WTA Tour. It was the 19th edition of the tournament and ran from 9 May through 15 May 1988. First-seeded Steffi Graf won the singles title.

Finals

Singles

 Steffi Graf defeated  Helena Suková 6–3, 6–2
 It was Graf's 4th singles title of the year and the 23rd of her career.

Doubles

 Isabelle Demongeot /  Nathalie Tauziat defeated  Claudia Kohde-Kilsch /  Helena Suková 6–2, 4–6, 6–4
 It was Demongeot's 1st title of the year and the 2nd of her career. It was Tauziat's 1st title of the year and the 2nd of her career.

External links
 ITF tournament edition details

WTA German Open
WTA German Open
1988 in German tennis